The Crucial Conspiracy is the third full-length album by Californian ska band The Dingees. The album shows a reggae and roots music influence, although its style constantly shifts and includes what was described as only "a fading memory" of third wave ska.

Track listing
 "Spray Paint"  – 3:03
 "Middle Man"  – 2:14
 "Summer"  – 3:41
 "Dear Sister, Dear Brother"  – 4:21
 "Christina Fight Back"  – 1:41
 "Ronnie Raygun"  – 1:15
 "We Rot the Voodoo"  – 2:52
 "General Information"  – 2:17
 "Latch Key Kids"  – 3:44
 "Moving Underground"  – 4:10
 "Whole Scene"  – 3:43
 "The World's Last Night"  – 4:37
 "Declaration" – 1:39

Lineup
Pegleg - Vocals, Guitar, Sax
Dave Chevalier - Throat, Tenor Sax, Organ, Piano
Aaron Landers - Guitar, Organ, Backups
Bean - M-Bass
Scott Rodgers - Drums, Backups

Guest musicians
J Bonner - Hammond Organ, Rhodes, Clavinet, Melodica, Produb
Angelo Moore - Bari Sax, Alto Sax, Theremin, Vocals
Ronnie Martin - Synth
Travis Larsen - Trombone
Mike Sullivan - Trumpet
Frank Lenz - Drums, Percussion, Organ, Piano
Chris Colbert - Sampling

Miscellaneous
The Crucial Conspiracy was re-released on vinyl by Open Water Records in 2009.

References

The Dingees albums
2001 albums
Tooth & Nail Records albums